Prom Nights from Hell is a 2007 anthology, featuring five young adult horror/romance short stories. The novellas were written respectively by Meg Cabot, Kim Harrison, Michele Jaffe, Stephenie Meyer and Lauren Myracle.

Stories 
"Hell on Earth", by Stephenie Meyer
"The Exterminator's Daughter", by Meg Cabot
"The Corsage" (an adaptation of "The Monkey's Paw", by W. W. Jacobs), by Lauren Myracle
"Madison Avery and the Dim Reaper" (an introduction to the Madison Avery trilogy), by Kim Harrison
"Kiss and Tell", by Michele Jaffe

References

External links
Prom Nights from Hell on HarperCollins.com
Prom Nights from Hell on MegCabot.com

2007 anthologies
American anthologies
Paranormal romance anthologies
Proms in fiction
HarperCollins books